The Silverado Resort and Spa is a  golf, tennis, and spa resort in Napa County, California, United States. The venue is named after the Silverado Mine, a quicksilver mine near Mount Saint Helena. The resort is the fifth largest employer in Napa County.

The United States Census Bureau has designated the area surrounding the Silverado Resort as a separate census-designated place (CDP) for statistical purposes. The population of the CDP was 1,095 at the 2010 census.  

In October 2017, parts of the resort were damaged by wildfires; flames arrived hours after the conclusion of the Safeway Open.

The Country Club
The resort's centerpiece southern style mansion was built by General John Franklin Miller in the 1860s. Amfac, Inc. developed the property as a resort in the 1960s and it was purchased by Robert Meyer in 1984 for $20 million. He sold it to Isao Okawa in 1989 for $110 million, and after his death it was inherited by his son, Setsuo Okawa; the property was listed for sale by the Okawa family in September 2009.In 2010, professional golfer and businessman Johnny Miller, Rug Doctor Corporation founder Roger Kent, and its CEO Tim Wall assumed ownership of the resort under a partnership agreement named Silverado Resort Investment Group LLC on July 1. Dolce Hotels and Resorts Company was hired by the partnership to manage the resort. He also lengthened the club's driving range and added a teaching area to the range. The resort was sold to KSL Capital Partners, LLC and Arcade Capital LLC in 2022.

Golf
The original 18-hole golf course at Silverado opened  in 1955, and is now the North Course. In 1966, it was re-designed by Robert Trent Jones, Jr. and the South Course was added.  The resort also has 16 tennis courts, 10 swimming pools, 280 guest condo hotel units and private cottage suites. There are 300 privately owned condominiums on the grounds of the resort.

The resort has played host to several PGA Tour events.  The north course hosted the Kaiser International Open Invitational from 1968 through 1976 and the Anheuser-Busch Golf Classic from 1977 through 1980. Champions Tour events from 1989 to 2002 were held on the south course at Silverado under the titles of Transamerica, Transamerica Senior Golf Championship, and Napa Valley Championship. The PGA Tour returned to the north course in October 2014 with the Frys.com Open, now the Safeway Open.

Scorecards

Natural features

Milliken Creek, a tributary to the Napa River, flows through the Silverado Country Club. There are approximately  planted to vineyards in this watershed including the drainage area of Milliken Reservoir.  Milliken Creek rises on the western slopes of the east side of the Napa Valley before flowing through the Silverado Country Club property.  Much of this area had once been part of the Mexican land grant Rancho Yajome.  Most of this watershed was wilderness area to at least 1869, and thereafter the lower watershed was begun to be developed as pasture and grazing agricultural uses.  In a 1989 stream survey conducted for the Silverado country Club by Earth Metrics Inc, the steelhead fishery was found to be robust up to and including the Silverado Country Club.

Demographics

In 2010, the United States Census Bureau made the Silverado Resort and the residential areas immediately outside its perimeter as a separate census-designated place (CDP) for statistical purposes. The area is an unincorporated area north of the City of Napa. Per the 2020 census, the population was 948.

2020 census

Note: the US Census treats Hispanic/Latino as an ethnic category. This table excludes Latinos from the racial categories and assigns them to a separate category. Hispanics/Latinos can be of any race.

See also
Atlas Peak

References

External links
 
 Dolce Hotels and Resorts: Silverado Resort and Spa

Buildings and structures in Napa County, California
Golf clubs and courses in California
Resorts in California
Tourist attractions in Napa County, California
Census-designated places in Napa County, California
Census-designated places in California